From Scenes Like These is a 1968 novel by Gordon Williams. The novel, published by Secker & Warburg, was shortlisted for the inaugural Booker Prize in 1969. The title is taken from "The Cotter's Saturday Night", a poem by Robert Burns that describes Scottish rural life in an idyllic light.

Summary
Set in the west of Scotland during the 1950s, the novel follows fifteen-year-old Duncan Logan as he leaves school to work on a farm. His youthful aspirations, fostered by reading authors such as John Dos Passos, are thwarted as he enters an adult world defined by alcohol, violence and betrayal, with his family scorning his attempts to better himself.

Reception
From Scenes Like These was shortlisted for the inaugural Booker Prize in 1969, which was won by P. H. Newby for Something to Answer For. The critic D. J. Taylor described From Scenes Like These in 2003 as "one of the greatest novels of the postwar era."

References

External links
 

1968 British novels
Scottish bildungsromans
Novels set in the 1950s
Novels set in Scotland
Secker & Warburg books